Ruch Oporu Armii Krajowej - Polish anticommunist military resistance organization formed in 1944 by Józef Marcinkowski from Armia Krajowa soldiers.
Main goal was counteracting Soviet domination over Poland. They engaged in many skirmishes with the Internal Security Corps and NKVD soldiers. Executed many Polish Workers' Party and UB collaborators.

References

Polish dissident organisations
National liberation movements
Paramilitary organisations based in Poland